Epermenia epirrhicna is a moth in the family Epermeniidae. It was described by Edward Meyrick in 1938. It is found in the former Orientale Province of the Democratic Republic of the Congo.

References

Epermeniidae
Moths described in 1938
Moths of Africa
Lepidoptera of the Democratic Republic of the Congo